Written and illustrated by Daisuke Moriyama, the manga series Chrono Crusade spans 56 chapters, called "Acts". The first chapter premiered in the November 1998 issue Dragon Age, where the series ran until its conclusion in the June 2004 issue. The individual chapters were published in eight tankōbon volumes by Kadokawa Shoten from December 1999 to September 2004.

The series was licensed for English language release in North America by ADV Manga, which released the eight volumes from May 2004 through May 2006. The series was released in English in Australia and New Zealand by Madman Entertainment. It was also licensed for regional language releases in France by Asuka, in Mexico by Grupo Editorial Vid, in Italy by Planet Manga, Germany by Carlsen Comics, and in Denmark and Sweden by Mangismo. Gonzo produced a twenty-four episode anime series based on the manga that aired in Japan on Fuji TV from November 24, 2003 until June 10, 2004 and was licensed for release in North America by ADV Films.

All eight volumes of the manga feature Rosette Christopher and Chrono on the covers.


Volume listing

See also
 List of Chrono Crusade episodes

References

External links
 Official Madman Entertainment Chrono Crusade site
 

Chrono Crusade